Chenxi railway station is a fourth-class railway station Huomachong Town, Chenxi County, Huaihua, Hunan on the Zhuzhou–Guiyang railway, part of the Shanghai–Kunming railway. It was built in 1972 and is under the jurisdiction of China Railway Guangzhou Group.

References 

Railway stations in Hunan
Railway stations in Huaihua